Kaph (also spelled kaf) is the eleventh letter of the Semitic abjads, including Phoenician kāp  , Hebrew kāf , Aramaic kāp  , Syriac kāp̄ , and Arabic kāf   (in abjadi order).

The Phoenician letter gave rise to the Greek kappa (Κ), Latin K, and Cyrillic К.

Origin of kaph
Kaph is thought to be derived from a pictogram of a hand (in both modern Arabic and modern Hebrew, kaph כף means "palm" or "grip"), though in Arabic the a in the name of the letter (كاف) is pronounced longer than the a in the word meaning "palm" (كَف).
D46

Hebrew kaf

Hebrew spelling:

Hebrew pronunciation

The letter kaf is one of the six letters that can receive a dagesh kal. The other five are bet, gimel, daleth, pe, and tav (see Hebrew alphabet for more about these letters).

There are two orthographic variants of this letter that alter the pronunciation:

Kaf with the dagesh
When the kaph has a "dot" in its center, known as a dagesh, it represents a voiceless velar plosive. There are various rules in Hebrew grammar that stipulate when and why a dagesh is used.

Kaf without the dagesh (khaf)
When this letter appears as  without the dagesh ("dot") in its center it represents , like the ch in German "Bach".

Final form of kaf

If the letter is at the end of a word the symbol is drawn differently.  However, it does not change the pronunciation or transliteration in any way.   The name for the letter is final kaf. Four additional Hebrew letters take final forms: tsadi, mem, nun, and pei. Kaf/khaf is the only Hebrew letter that can take a vowel in its word-final form, which is pronounced after the consonant, that vowel being the qamatz.

Significance of kaph in Hebrew
In gematria, kaph represents the number 20. Its final form represents 500, but this is rarely used, tav and qoph (400+100) being used instead.

As a prefix, kaph is a preposition:
It can mean "like" or "as", as in literary Arabic (see below).
In colloquial Hebrew, kaph and shin together have the meaning of "when".

Arabic kāf
The letter is named kāf, and it is written in several ways depending on its position in the word.

There are three variants of the letter:
 the basic form is used for the Arabic language and many other languages:

 the long s-shaped variant form, which is used in Arabic texts and for writing the Qur'an. It has a particular use in the Sindhi language of Pakistan, where it represents the unaspirated /k/, in contrast to the aspirated /kʰ/, which is written using the "normal" kāf  (called keheh).

In varieties of Arabic kāf is almost universally pronounced as the voiceless velar plosive , but in rural Palestinian and Iraqi, it is pronounced as a voiceless postalveolar affricate .

Use in literary Arabic
In Literary Arabic, kāf, when used as a prefix   , is one of the Arabic words for "like", "as", or "as though" (the other, is unrelated).

kāf is used as a possessive suffix for second-person singular nouns (feminine taking  ,  and masculine   ); for instance,   ("book") becomes   ("your book", where the person spoken to is masculine)   ("your book", where the person spoken to is feminine). At the ends of sentences and often in conversation the final vowel is suppressed, and thus   ("your book").

Character encodings

See also 
 Ca (Indic)
 Gaf
 Ka (Indic)
 Ngaph

References

Phoenician alphabet
Arabic letters
Hebrew letters
Letters with final form